Proctor House may refer to:

Brown-Proctor House, Scottsboro, Alabama, listed on the National Register of Historic Places (NRHP) in Jackson County, Alabama
Davis-Proctor House, Twin City, Georgia, listed on the NRHP in Emanuel County, Georgia
Proctor House (Bryantsville, Kentucky), listed on the NRHP in Garrard County, Kentucky
George N. Proctor House, Waverly, Kentucky, listed on the NRHP in Union County, Kentucky
Proctor House (Bel Air, Maryland), listed on the NRHP in Harford County, Maryland
William Proctor House (Arlington, Massachusetts), listed on the NRHP in Middlesex County, Massachusetts
William Proctor House (Marengo, Indiana), listed on the NRHP in Crawford County, Indiana
Rea-Proctor Homestead, Danvers, Massachusetts, listed on the NRHP in Essex County, Massachusetts
John Proctor House (Peabody, Massachusetts), listed on the NRHP in Essex County, Massachusetts
John Proctor House (Westford, Massachusetts), listed on the NRHP in Middlesex County, Massachusetts
Proctor House (Victoria, Texas), |listed on the NRHP in Victoria County, Texas
Proctor-Vandenberge House, Victoria, Texas, listed on the NRHP in Victoria County, Texas
Proctor-Clement House, Rutland, Vermont, listed on the NRHP in Rutland County, Vermont
Proctor Maple Research Farm, Underhill, Vermont, listed on the NRHP in Chittenden County, Vermont

See also
John Proctor House (disambiguation)
Proctor Building (disambiguation)
Proctor's Theater (disambiguation)